D425 is a state road in Croatia, connecting the outskirts of Ploče with the A1 motorway connector at the Karamatići toll station. Its main purpose is a connection from the motorway to the Port of Ploče.

The road, as well as all other state roads in Croatia, is managed and maintained by Hrvatske ceste, a state-owned company.

History

The road was initially built as a single connector route between the A1 and the Port of Ploče, at the time designated as part of A10.
The dual carriageway part of the route was built in two phases, the first between finished in December 2008, and the second in December 2013. The dual carriageway extends from Karamatići to the Radonjić Viaduct.

Under the current official road classification, the D425 ends at the toll station, while the continuation of the road to the north, a  expressway connector from the Karamatići toll plaza to the A1 Ploče interchange, is not classified as part of the D425. It is instead tolled as part of the A1 system, and it includes the Mali Prolog viaduct (278m), the Mali Prolog tunnel (1029/1092m), the Kobiljača tunnel (769m), the Brečići-Struge viaduct (598m), the Puljani tunnel (320m), and the Kula viaduct (448m).

Traffic volume 

Road traffic in Croatia is regularly counted and reported by Hrvatske ceste, the operator of the road. The traffic entering D425 specifically is counted by Croatian Motorways Ltd at the Karamatići entrance.

Substantial variations between annual (AADT) and summer (ASDT) traffic volumes are attributed to the fact that the road serves as a connection to the A1 motorway and the D8 state road carrying substantial tourist traffic.

Road junctions and populated areas

Sources

External links

 

Expressways in Croatia
State roads in Croatia
Transport in Dubrovnik-Neretva County